Kate Warne (1833 – January 28, 1868) was an American law enforcement officer known as the first female detective, in 1856, in the Pinkerton Detective Agency and the United States.

Pre–Civil War

Early detective work: 1856–1861 
Very little is known about Kate Warne prior to her working for Allan Pinkerton, except that she was born in Erin, Chemung County, New York and was a widow by age 23. Pinkerton, in his book The Spy of the Rebellion (1883), described her as:

[a] commanding person, with clear cut, expressive features ... a slender, brown-haired woman, graceful in her movements and self-possessed. Her features, although not what could be called handsome [beautiful], were decidedly of an intellectual cast ... her face was honest, which would cause one in distress instinctly [sic] to select her as a confidante.

Warne walked into the Pinkerton Detective Agency in response to an advertisement in a local newspaper. According to Pinkerton company records:

[he] was surprised to learn Kate was not looking for clerical work, but was actually answering an advertisement for detectives he had placed in a Chicago newspaper. At the time, such a concept was almost unheard of. Pinkerton said "It is not the custom to employ women detectives!" Kate argued her point of view eloquently – pointing out that women could be "most useful in worming out secrets in many places which would be impossible for a male detective." A Woman would be able to befriend the wives and girlfriends of suspected criminals and gain their confidence. Men become braggarts when they are around women who encourage them to boast. Kate also noted, Women have an eye for detail and are excellent observers.

Warne's arguments swayed Pinkerton, who employed her as his first female detective. Pinkerton soon had a chance to put Warne to the test. In 1858, Warne was involved in the case of Adams Express Company embezzlements, where she was successfully able to bring herself into the confidence of the wife of the prime suspect, Mr. Maroney. She thereby acquired valuable evidence, leading to the husband's conviction. Mr. Maroney was an expressman living in Montgomery, Alabama. The Maroneys stole $50,000 from the Adams Express Company. With Warne's help, $39,515 was returned. Mr. Maroney was convicted and sentenced to ten years in Montgomery, Alabama. In 1860, Allan Pinkerton put Warne in charge of his new Female Detective Bureau.

The Baltimore Plot 
In 1861, Allan Pinkerton was hired by Samuel H. Felton, president of the Philadelphia, Wilmington and Baltimore Railroad, to investigate secessionist activity and threats of damage to the railroad in Maryland. Pinkerton went to work placing agents at various points in Maryland to investigate this potential activity. As the investigation proceeded, Pinkerton became aware that the activity in Maryland did not just end with the railroad; it also included the president-elect, Abraham Lincoln. Pinkerton received permission to continue his investigation and focus on the possible assassination plot. Warne was one of five agents sent to Baltimore, Maryland, on February 3, 1861, to investigate the hotbed of secessionist activity.

During the investigation, evidence unveiled a plot to assassinate Lincoln on his way to take office. Under the aliases Mrs. Cherry and Mrs. M. Barley (M.B.), Warne tracked suspicious movement among the Baltimore secessionists. It was in part through her undercover work in the guise of:

[A] rich Southern lady visiting Baltimore with a thick southern accent that apparently Mrs. Warne infiltrated secessionist social gatherings, in the Baltimore area, places such as the classy Barnum Hotel (Barnum's City Hotel), posing as a flirting "Southern belle" and was quick to not only verify that there was a plot to assassinate Lincoln, she developed details of how the assassination was going to occur.

Pinkerton had agents across Maryland, but it was Warne specifically who supplied many of the key details that led Pinkerton to believe that the plot was imminent. Warne had befriended secessionists in Maryland and collected many details about the plot to assassinate Lincoln.

The president-elect, Abraham Lincoln, was traveling from his home in Springfield, Illinois, to the Capital via a train tour that was to stop at notable cities along the way. His published program showed that Lincoln's last leg of the journey was from Harrisburg, Pennsylvania, to Washington, D.C. Due to the configuration of the rail system, all southbound trains required a transfer to be made in Baltimore, Maryland. The tracks from points north ended at Calvert Street and the tracks heading south started at Camden Street (now the Camden Yards station). The distance between these two stations was about a mile by carriage ride.

The secessionist plot to kill Lincoln was:

just as Mr. Lincoln would be passing through the narrow vestibule of the Depot at Calvert St. Station, to enter his carriage. A row or fight was to be got up by some outsiders to quell which the few policemen at the Depot would rush out, thus leaving Mr. Lincoln entirely unprotected and at the mercy of a mob of Secessionists who were to surround him at that time. A small Steamer had been chartered and was lying in one of the Bays or little streams running into the Chesapeake Bay, to which the murderers were to flee and it was immediately to put off for Virginia.

After seeing the pieces of the plot coming together, Pinkerton directed Kate Warne to take the 5:10 evening train to New York City on the morning of February 18. Once there, she was to set up a meeting with Norman B. Judd and give him a letter from Pinkerton outlining the known details of the assassination attempt. After receiving the details of the Baltimore Plot from Warne, Judd set up a meeting between himself, Pinkerton, and Lincoln on February 21. At this meeting, Lincoln was doubtful of the existence of an assassination plot or that if such a plot existed that it should be taken seriously.

However, a second independent source confirmed the plot by way of Frederick W. Seward, son of William H. Seward (the secretary of state–designate). From this point, Lincoln agreed that the assassination plot was plausible enough to take action. Lincoln decided to avoid hazard where it was not necessary; however, he refused to cancel any of his scheduled plans in Harrisburg. His agenda included: giving three speeches, raising of the American flag at Independence Hall, and attending a high-profile dinner.

Train arrangements were made accordingly that allowed Lincoln to fulfill his scheduled duties in Harrisburg. It was not until 5:45 at night that there was any deviation from his schedule. John George Nicolay, Lincoln's private secretary, interrupted the dinner party to excuse the president-elect. Lincoln then changed into a traveling suit and a soft felt cap. He carried a shawl upon one arm to play the role of an invalid. Pinkerton, meanwhile, had the telegraph lines interrupted to prevent any knowledge of the deviation in Lincoln's schedule. At the station, Warne entered the sleeping car through the rear along with Pinkerton, Ward Hill Lamon, and a still-disguised Lincoln. She greeted Lincoln loudly as she would have a true brother.

From Harrisburg, Abraham Lincoln rode to Philadelphia by a special Pennsylvania Railroad train. From Philadelphia he went to Baltimore by a special Philadelphia, Wilmington, and Baltimore train on the night of February 22–23. It is said that Kate Warne did not sleep a wink on the overnight trip from Pennsylvania to Washington D.C. The disguises provided by Warne that night enabled Lincoln to make it through Baltimore without recognition and take his seat in the White House. It is believed that Pinkerton came up with the slogan to his agency "we never sleep" as a result of Warne's guard of Lincoln that night. Warne was key in the foiled Baltimore assassination plot – not only did she help uncover its details, but she also carried out most of the arrangements to smuggle Lincoln into Washington, D.C. She couriered secret information and set up meetings as well as securing the necessary four berths on a train leaving Philadelphia under the pretext that these berths were for her sick brother and family members. The train pulled out shortly before 11 p.m. and arrived in Baltimore about 3:30 a.m. on February 23. Warne remained in Baltimore as the sleeping cars with Lincoln on board were shifted to another train, which arrived in Washington around 6 a.m.

Civil War: Intelligence work for the Union, 1861–1865 

During the American Civil War, Allan Pinkerton and Kate Warne were used as a covert war intelligence-gathering bureau. Warne could easily penetrate into Southern social gatherings. She said that women are most useful in worming out secrets in many places which would be impossible for a male detective. Believed to be a mistress of Pinkerton, Warne would often pose as his wife while undercover. She also had an assortment of alias names: Kay Warne, Kay Waren, Kay Warren, Kate Waren, Kate Warren, Kitty Warne, Kitty Waren, Kitty Warren, Kittie Waren, Kittie Warne, and Kittie Warren. Warne was known as "Kitty" to Robert Pinkerton, Allan's brother. Robert Pinkerton often argued with Warne over expenses turned over to the agency, but her relationship with Allan continued for years.

After the quelled assassination attempt on president-elect Abraham Lincoln, Kate Warne continued to travel with Allan Pinkerton as his Female Superintendent of Detectives. On April 12, 1861, the Confederate States of America's cannons in Charleston began firing on Fort Sumter. These cannon shells marked the beginning of the American Civil War. Within nine days, Pinkerton wrote to President Lincoln offering the services of the Pinkerton National Detective Agency. However, before Lincoln could respond, Major General George B. McClellan asked Pinkerton to set up a military intelligence service for McClellan's command. Therefore, by the end of July 1861, Pinkerton took Warne, Timothy Webster, and later George Bangs west to set up a headquarters in Cincinnati, Ohio, to follow McClellan's Ohio division (see also Cincinnati in the Civil War).

Post-Civil War: Continued espionage, 1865–1867 
After the Civil War, Kate Warne worked on various high-profile cases. One of these involved the murder of a bank-teller, George Gordon. The murderer got away with $130,000. Pinkerton determined that Gordon was fetching money for a friend or someone who frequented the bank when he was struck on the head behind the ear with a hammer with intent to murder any witnesses of the robbery. Through his investigation, Pinkerton felt certain that his prime suspect, Alexander P. Drysdale, had in fact killed Gordon. However, at this point he did not have enough hard evidence to convict Drysdale; too much was still based on speculation. Therefore, he set a trap for Drysdale so that he would reveal a confession. Warne was sent under cover as a Mrs. Potter and became close friends with Mr. Drysdale's wife. Through this plot, they were able to uncover where Drysdale had hidden the stolen money.

Another case for which Kate Warne went undercover was brought about by a Captain Sumner, who was convinced that both his sister, Mrs. Annie Thayer, and a Mr. Pattmore, were attempting to poison Mrs. Pattmore and himself. Warne took the name Lucille and assumed the role of a fortune teller to lure information out of the suspected murderer's confidants. In the meantime, she also continually coordinated Pinkerton's other female detectives in the agency. Pinkerton rented a space for Warne to work as part of her guise. Allan Pinkerton named Kate Warne one of the five best detectives that he had. Her employment by Pinkerton was a significant moment in Women's History. Women were not allowed to be a part of the police force until 1891 and could not be officers until 1908.

Pinkerton specifically thanked Kate Warne and Timothy Webster in his memoirs. Both Warne and Webster were key operatives during the Baltimore Plot investigations. Warne reported back to Pinkerton about all her work when he was away from the office and they worked together, on numerous cases, during their tenure. Pinkerton constantly showed a deep trust in the work that Warne performed and acknowledges so in his memoirs. She was in charge of the Female Detective Bureau established by Pinkerton, her title being Supervisor of Women Agents. Pinkerton said to his female prospective agents:

In my service you will serve your country better than on the field.  I have several female operatives. If you agree to come aboard you will go in training with the head of my female detectives, Kate Warne. She has never let me down.

Burial 

Warne was buried in the Pinkerton family plot at Graceland Cemetery, Chicago, Illinois. Her gravestone is marked under the misspelled surname of "Warn", and states that she died of "congestion of the lungs." Pinkerton wanted her burial plot to be undisturbed, so he took care of the issue in his will. Warne's burial plot could never be sold.

In popular culture 
In August 2021, Amazon Studios acquired the distribution rights to an upcoming film produced by Seven Bucks Productions starring Emily Blunt as Warne.

See also 
 American Civil War spies
 Hattie Lawton
 Timothy Webster
 Allan Pinkerton

References

Further reading 
 Stashower, David, 2013. The Hour of Peril:The Secret Plot to Murder Lincoln before the Civil War,  Minotaur Books, New York. .
 
 Hannigan, Kate, 2015. The Detective's Assistant, Little, Brown Books for Young Readers, New York; . Historical fiction based on the cases of Kate Warne.
 
 
 

=

1833 births
1868 deaths
Date of birth missing
American Civil War spies
Baltimore Plot
Burials at Graceland Cemetery (Chicago)
History of Baltimore
People from Chemung County, New York
People of Maryland in the American Civil War
Pinkerton (detective agency)
Private detectives and investigators
Women in the American Civil War